The 1977–78 season was the 69th year of football played by Dundee United, and covers the period from 1 July 1977 to 30 June 1978. United finished in third place, securing UEFA Cup football for the following season.

Match results
Dundee United played a total of 50 competitive matches during the 1977–78 season.

Legend

All results are written with Dundee United's score first.
Own goals in italics

Premier Division

Scottish Cup

League Cup

UEFA Cup

League table

References

See also
 1977–78 in Scottish football

Dundee United F.C. seasons
Dundee United